The KTM ETS, commercially known as ETS, short for Electric Train Service, is an inter-city rail passenger service in Malaysia operated by Keretapi Tanah Melayu (KTM) using electric multiple-unit (EMU) trains. The KTM ETS is the second electric train service to be operated by the Malaysian railway company, after the KTM Komuter service, and the second inter-city rail service, after KTM Intercity.

The rail service is currently operated by KTM Intercity Division. It was previously operated by ETS Sendirian Berhad, a fully owned subsidiary of Keretapi Tanah Melayu Berhad.

Train services

Routes

The line from Gemas to Johor Bahru is currently a single track and is being double tracked and electrified. Most routes originate from KL Sentral, the main railway station of Kuala Lumpur, the capital city of Malaysia

The ETS operates 5 routes, namely:
KL Sentral - 
KL Sentral - 
KL Sentral - 
 -  via KL Sentral and 
 -  via KL Sentral and 

Currently, there are 5 return trips on the KL Sentral -  route, 5 return trips on the KL Sentral -  route, 4 return trips on the KL Sentral -  route and 1 return trip each on the  -  and  -  routes daily. As of 2020, due to travelling restrictions and efforts to curb the pandemic, there are only 2 trips per day along the 5 routes that is currently under operation, while as of 2022 all services have been resume with lesser Gold service trains.

The latest timetables for the routes are available on the official ETS timetable.

Services
The train services are operated in 3 categories:
Platinum service with limited stops (9 return trips), along with business class coach service
Gold service with selected stops (6 return trips)
Silver service with stops at all stations. (1 return trip)

List of Stations

-  via  and KL Sentral

- KL Sentral/

Ridership

History

First phase 

The service was introduced by Keretapi Tanah Melayu (KTM) on 12 August 2010 between Ipoh and Seremban following the completion of the electrification and double-tracking of the Rawang to Ipoh stretch of the West Coast Line. Its inaugural run was celebrated with an opening ceremony at Kuala Lumpur railway station.  Initially, services stretched southwards to Seremban, but the KL Sentral - Seremban sector was taken out of service in October 2012. At launch, there were three service types—Platinum, Gold and Silver. On the fastest Platinum service, the trip was covered in two hours, one hour faster than by car. Gold and silver services had more stops, hence taking up to 2 hours 30 minutes. The route was served solely by 5 Class 91 electric trains.

Second phase

The service was extended from Ipoh to Padang Besar via Butterworth, the mainland town opposite George Town, with the introduction of the ETS Transit on 10 July 2015, with stops at 24 stations. At the inception of service, only one train service in both directions was introduced. This service was given the name ETS Transit.

On the following day on 11 July 2015, a new service called the ETS Ekspres between KL Sentral and Padang Besar, via Butterworth was introduced, which only stops at 15 stations. New rolling stock, the Class 93 trains, were introduced in conjunction with the extended service.

Third phase

This extension of service also saw the ETS service returning to  after being discontinued in 2012.

There were constant revisions of timetables and services as more trains became available, with more train service being added for each of the route segments. The Platinum, Gold, and Silver services were also reintroduced while the terms "ETS Ekspres" and "ETS Transit" were no longer used.

Rolling stock

First Generation

Five KTM Class 91 train sets, each comprising six cars, were purchased by KTM for $67 million (USD). The train sets were designed by the Marubeni Corporation and jointly built by Hyundai Rotem of South Korea and Mitsubishi Electric of Japan. The maximum operational speed of the ETS fleet is 140 km/h but is designed to travel up to 160 km/h.  The total length of each train set is 138 m and weighs 231.8 tons. Each carriage is 22.95 m long, 2.75 m wide and 4 m high. Each train set has a passenger seating capacity of 350 and includes on-board facilities including toilets, a buffet car, power sockets per two seats and two LED Televisions per car.

Second Generation

Nineteen sets of KTM Class 93 trains were ordered in two batches to expand the fleet as the electrified network expanded. All 19 trains are in service as of October 2019.

The rolling stock was to have been put into operation for the launch of the ETS Express service between KL Sentral and Padang Besar, and the ETS Transit service between Ipoh and Padang Besar. However, reports of problems during the testing and commissioning of the train sets resulted in the then Malaysian land public transport authority, SPAD, not approving the trains for use in time for the launch of the two services on 10 July 2015 and 11 July 2015. As a result, two KTM Class 91 train sets were used for the time being, one for the ETS Express, and the other for the ETS Transit, allowing for just one trip in each direction for both services.

The first four KTM Class 93 sets went into service on 10 October 2015. All sets from the first batch have entered service.

The second batch differs slightly from the first, with a redesigned livery and a business class coach, a first for ETS services, and started operations with the launch of the new ETS Business Class in October 2019. These coaches were given the name Class 93/2.

A third batch of 11 Class 93 is tendered in March 2022 in light with the completion of the Gemas-JB Sentral EDTP modification.

Longest and fastest metre-gauge trains in the world
The ETS trains currently travel up to 140 km/h on the electrified metre gauge rail line. Due to the gauge, the service can be considered a higher speed rail (HrSR) limited-express service.

Similar services operate on 1,067mm (3 ft 6 in) narrow gauge railways in other parts of the world: the Kamome & Sonic Express in Japan, the Taroko & Puyuma Express in Taiwan, and the Electric & Diesel Tilt Train services in Australia.
The only similar metre gauge rail service currently operating is the Renfe Feve on Cercanías Asturias & Euskotren Trena, the Bilbao-Donostia inter-city rail line in northern Spain. This type of inter-state train service is very similar to KTM Komuter Northern Sector regional commuter services.

The ETS thus currently stands as one of the fastest 1,000 mm (3 ft 3 3⁄8 in) metre gauge train services in the world, reaching a maximum speed of 140 km/h.

On-board service

Standard Class 
The seats are arranged in a 2+2 fashion and each seat comes with a tray table and a power outlet. Cluster seats with fixed tables are available on the Class 93. The seats can be easily converted for wheelchair use should the need arise. There are LCD TV screens in every coach for entertainment. Toilets are available in every coach. There are changing tables for infants on the latest Class 93/2. For Muslim passengers, there is a prayer room in every train. There is a bistro coach which sells drinks, light snacks and microwaved meals. This class is available on all trains, and is the only class available on older trains such as the Class 91 and the Class 93/1.

Business Class 
The Business Class service marks a step-up from the Standard Class. In addition to the facilities already enjoyed in the Standard Class, there are additional features otherwise not seen on the Standard Class. The seats are arranged in a 2+1 configuration and are wider and able to recline up to 45 degrees. The seats can be rotated to face any direction. In addition to a power outlet, a USB port is also provided per seat. Each seat has its own on-demand video screen for in-train entertainment. Wi-Fi is complimentary for Business Class passengers. Each coach has its own steward or stewardess, whom the passengers can summon from their seats. On-board dining is included in the fare. Passengers are also given their own amenity kit. This service is only available on the Class 93/2 trains.

ETS Line extensions

Gemas - JB Sentral (under construction)
The MYR 8 billion contract was expected to be tendered out by the end of 2008 pending a mid-term review of the Ninth Malaysia Plan. The project would have included building over 200 km of parallel railway tracks, including stations, depots, halts, yards and bridges and cover systems such as electrification, signaling and communications.
This included a realignment between of the Pulau Sebang/Tampin - Gemas section.

In May 2009, Global Rail Sdn Bhd, a relatively small contractor and its Chinese partner, China Infraglobe submitted a proposal to the Government to build and upgrade tracks from Gemas to Johor Bahru at a cost of MYR 5 billion. According to them, the project would be on a private finance initiative basis and the plan submitted to the Ministry of Finance later in June 2009 was conditional upon signing over mineral rights in the state of Johor.

On 29 January 2011, then Transport Minister Datuk Seri Kong Cho Ha said that the Gemas - Johor Bahru double-tracking and electrification project was expected to start that year. He added that the Government hoped to appoint the contractor for the project that year and Malaysia was still in the midst of talking with China Railway Construction, but nothing was confirmed yet. Kong said two consultants had been appointed, a design consultant and an independent checker, to monitor the project. The construction of 197 km of tracks, at an estimated cost between MYR 6 billion and MYR 7 billion, would take three years.

On 27 October 2015, the public display exercise, required for all development of new railways under Section 84 of Malaysia's Land Public Transport Act 2010, for the Gemas - Johor Bahru Electrification and Double Tracking Project began and ran until 27 January 2016. The Chinese company CRCC has been awarded to carry out the Gemas - Johor Bahru Electrification and Double Tracking Project. Construction on the project began in January 2018. It is expected to be completed by mid-2023.

The length of the line to be electrified and double-tracked is 197 km between Chainage 563.040 at Gemas and Chainage 754.180 at JB Sentral. The upgraded line is supposed to cater for at least 22 services daily involving ETS, KTM Intercity and shuttle train services as well as the KTM Komuter.

The documents displayed also stated that the electrification for the stretch will have the same specifications as that of the Seremban-Gemas stretch, at 25 kV AC 50 Hz single phase and supplied via an overhead catenary. Train operations for this stretch will be integrated with the Train Control Centers at KL Sentral and Gemas. The designed maximum speed for the tracks is 160 km/h.

Possible Future Extensions 
There are plans to extend the Electric Train Service lines in the future from Padang Besar to Hat Yai.

Gallery

See also
Keretapi Tanah Melayu
KTM Intercity and KTM ETS
KTM West Coast Line
KTM East Coast Line
KTM Komuter
Seremban Line
Port Klang Line
Skypark Link
 Northern Sector
Rail transport in Malaysia
Public transport in Kuala Lumpur

References

External links 
 ETS Ticket Online - Compare and Buy ETS Ticket Online

2010 establishments in Malaysia
 
Passenger rail transport in Malaysia
Railway services introduced in 2010
Keretapi Tanah Melayu